Tissue paper or simply tissue is a lightweight paper or, light crêpe paper. Tissue can be made from recycled paper pulp on a paper machine.

Tissue paper is very versatile, and different kinds of tissue are made to best serve these purposes, which are hygienic tissue paper, facial tissues, paper towels, as packing material, among other (sometimes creative) uses.

The use of tissue paper is common in developed nations, around 21 million tonnes in North America and 6 million in Europe, and is growing due to urbanization. As a result, the industry has often been scrutinized for deforestation. However, more companies are presently using more recycled fibres in tissue paper.

Properties
The key properties of tissues are absorbency, basis weight, thickness, bulk (specific volume), brightness, stretch, appearance and comfort.

Production

Tissue paper is produced on a paper machine that has a single large steam heated drying cylinder (Yankee dryer) fitted with a hot air hood. The raw material is paper pulp. The Yankee cylinder is sprayed with adhesives to make the paper stick. Creping is done by the Yankee's doctor blade that is scraping the dry paper off the cylinder surface. The crinkle (crêping) is controlled by the strength of the adhesive, geometry of the doctor blade, speed difference between the Yankee and final section of the paper machine and paper pulp characteristics.

The highest water absorbing applications are produced with a through air drying (TAD) process. These papers contain high amounts of NBSK and CTMP. This gives a bulky paper with high wet tensile strength and good water holding capacity. The TAD process uses about twice the energy compared with conventional drying of paper.

The properties are controlled by pulp quality, crêping and additives (both in base paper and as coating). The wet strength is often an important parameter for tissue.

Applications

Hygienic tissue paper

Hygienic tissue paper is commonly for personal use as facial tissue (paper handkerchiefs), napkins, bathroom tissue and household towels. Paper has been used for hygiene purposes for centuries, but tissue paper as we know it today was not produced in the United States before the mid-1940s. In Western Europe large scale industrial production started in the beginning of the 1960s.

Facial tissues

Facial tissue (paper handkerchiefs) refers to a class of soft, absorbent, disposable paper that is suitable for use on the face. The term is commonly used to refer to the type of facial tissue, usually sold in boxes, that is designed to facilitate the expulsion of nasal mucus although it may refer to other types of facial tissues including napkins and wipes.

The first tissue handkerchiefs were introduced in the 1920s. They have been refined over the years, especially for softness and strength, but their basic design has remained constant. Today each person in Western Europe uses about 200 tissue handkerchiefs a year, with a variety of 'alternative' functions including the treatment of minor wounds, the cleaning of face and hands and the cleaning of spectacles.

The importance of the paper tissue on minimising the spread of an infection has been highlighted in light of fears over a swine flu epidemic. In the UK, for example, the Government ran a campaign called "Catch it, Bin it, Kill it", which encouraged people to cover their mouth with a paper tissue when coughing or sneezing.

Pressure on use of tissue papers has grown in the wake of improved hygiene concerns in response to the coronavirus pandemic.

Paper towels

Paper towels are the second largest application for tissue paper in the consumer sector. This type of paper has usually a basis weight of 20 to 24 g/m2. Normally such paper towels are two-ply. This kind of tissue can be made from 100% chemical pulp to 100% recycled fibre or a combination of the two. Normally, some long fibre chemical pulp is included to improve strength.

Wrapping tissue

Wrapping tissue is a type of thin, translucent tissue paper used for wrapping/packing various articles & cushioning fragile items.

Custom-printed wrapping tissue is becoming a popular trend for boutique retail businesses. There are various on-demand custom printed wrapping tissue paper available online. Sustainably printed custom tissue wrapping paper are printed on FSC-certified, acid-free paper; and only use soy-based inks.

Toilet paper

Rolls of toilet paper have been available since the end of the 19th century. Today, more than 20 billion rolls of toilet tissue are used each year in Western Europe.

Table napkins
Table napkins can be made of tissue paper. These are made from one up to four plies and in a variety of qualities, sizes, folds, colours and patterns depending on intended use and prevailing fashions. The composition of raw materials varies a lot from deinked to chemical pulp depending on quality.

Colored paper napkins can be a source of carcinogenic primary aromatic amines (paAs) when used as a wrapper for food as a result of degradation of Azo compounds used as paper dyes.

Acoustic disrupter 
In the late 1970s and early 1980s, a sound recording engineer named Bob Clearmountain was said to have hung tissue paper over the tweeter of his pair of Yamaha NS-10 speakers to tame the over-bright treble coming from it.

The phenomenon became the subject of hot debate and an investigation into the sonic effects of many different types of tissue paper. The authors of a study for Studio Sound magazine suggested that had the speakers' grilles been used in studios, they would have had the same effect on the treble output as the improvised tissue paper filter. Another tissue study found inconsistent results with different paper, but said that tissue paper generally demonstrated an undesirable effect known as "comb filtering", where the high frequencies are reflected back into the tweeter instead of being absorbed. The author derided the tissue practice as "aberrant behavior", saying that engineers usually fear comb filtering and its associated cancellation effects, suggesting that more controllable and less random electronic filtering would be preferable.

Road repair
Tissue paper, in the form of standard single-ply toilet paper, is commonly used in road repair to protect crack sealants. The sealants require upwards of 40 minutes to cure enough to not stick onto passing traffic. The application of toilet paper removes the stickiness and keeps the tar in place, allowing the road to be reopened immediately and increasing road repair crew productivity. The paper breaks down and disappears in the following days. The use has been credited to Minnesota Department of Transportation employee Fred Muellerleile, who came up with the idea in 1970 after initially trying standard office paper, which worked, but did not disintegrate easily.

Packing industry
Apart from above, a range of speciality tissues are also manufactured to be used in the packing industry. These are used for wrapping/packing various items, cushioning fragile items, stuffing in shoes/bags etc. to keep shape intact or, for inserting in garments etc. while packing/folding to keep them wrinkle free and safe. It is generally used printed with the manufacturers brand name or, logo to enhance the look and aesthetic appeal of the product. It is a type of thin, translucent paper generally in the range of grammages between 17 and 40 GSM, that can be rough or, shining, hard or soft, depending upon the nature of use.

The industry
In North America, people are consuming around three times as much tissue as in Europe.

The European tissue market is worth approximately 10 billion Euros annually and is growing at a rate of around 3%. The European market represents around 23% of the global market. Of the total paper and board market tissue accounts for 10%. An analysis and market research in Europe, Germany was one of the top tissue-consuming countries in Western Europe while Sweden was on top of the per-capita consumption of tissue paper in Western Europe. 
Market Study.

In Europe, the industry is represented by the European Tissue Symposium (ETS), a trade association. The members of ETS represent the majority of tissue paper producers throughout Europe and about 90% of total European tissue production. ETS was founded in 1971 and is based in Brussels since 1992.

In the U.S., the tissue industry is organized in the AF&PA.

Tissue paper production and consumption is predicted to continue to grow because of factors like urbanization, increasing disposable incomes and consumer spending. In 2015, the global market for tissue paper is growing at per annum rates between 8–9% (China, currently 40% of global market) and 2–3% (Europe).
Tissue demand on the consumer side booms while the AfH business turns down as majority stay at home amid COVID-19.

Companies
The largest tissue producing companies by capacity – some of them also global players – in 2015 are (in descending order):
Essity
Kimberly-Clark
Georgia-Pacific
Asia Pulp & Paper (APP)/Sinar Mas
Procter & Gamble
Sofidel Group
CMPC
WEPA Hygieneprodukte
Metsä Group
Cascades

Sustainability

The paper industry in general has a long history of accusations for being responsible for global deforestation through legal and illegal logging. The WWF has urged Asia Pulp & Paper (APP), "one of the world's most notorious deforesters" especially in Sumatran rain forests, to become an environmentally responsible company; in 2012, the WWF launched a campaign to remove a brand of toilet paper known to be made from APP fiber from grocery store shelves. According to the Worldwatch Institute, the world per capita consumption of toilet paper was 3.8 kilograms in 2005. The WWF estimates that "every day, about 270,000 trees are flushed down the drain or end up as garbage all over the world", a rate of which about 10% are attributable to toilet paper alone.

Meanwhile, the paper tissue industry, along with the rest of the paper manufacturing sector, has worked to minimise its impact on the environment. Recovered fibres now represent some 46.5% of the paper industry's raw materials. The industry relies heavily on biofuels (about 50% of its primary energy). Its specific primary energy consumption has decreased by 16% and the specific electricity consumption has decreased by 11%, due to measures such as improved process technology and investment in combined heat and power (CHP). Specific carbon dioxide emissions from fossil fuels decreased by 25% due to process-related measures and the increased use of low-carbon and biomass fuels. Once consumed, most forest-based paper products start a new life as recycled material or biofuel

EDANA, the trade body for the non-woven absorbent hygiene products industry (which includes products such as household wipes for use in the home) has reported annually on the industry's environmental performance since 2005. Less than 1% of all commercial wood production ends up as wood pulp in absorbent hygiene products. The industry contributes less than 0.5% of all solid waste and around 2% of municipal solid waste (MSW) compared with paper and board, garden waste and food waste which each comprise between 18 and 20 percent of MSW.

There has been a great deal of interest, in particular, in the use of recovered fibres to manufacture new tissue paper products. However, whether this is actually better for the environment than using new fibres is open to question. A life-cycle assessment study indicated that neither fibre type can be considered environmentally preferable. In this study both new fibre and recovered fibre offer environmental benefits and shortcomings.

Total environmental impacts vary case by case, depending on for example the location of the tissue paper mill, availability of fibres close to the mill, energy options and waste utilization possibilities. There are opportunities to minimise environmental impacts when using each fibre type.

When using recovered fibres, it is beneficial to:
 Source fibres from integrated deinking operations to eliminate the need for thermal drying of fibre or long distance transport of wet pulp,
 Manage deinked sludge in order to maximise beneficial applications and minimise waste burden on society; and
 Select the recovered paper depending on the end-product requirements and that also allows the most efficient recycling process.
When using new fibres, it is beneficial to:
 Manage the raw material sources to maintain legal, sustainable forestry practices by implementing processes such as forest certification systems and chain of custody standards; and
 Consider opportunities to introduce new and more renewable energy sources and increase the use of biomass fuels to reduce emissions of carbon dioxide.
When using either fibre type, it is beneficial to:
 Improve energy efficiency in tissue manufacturing;
 Examine opportunities for changing to alternative, non fossil based sources, of energy for tissue manufacturing operations
 Deliver products that maximise functionality and optimize consumption; and
 Investigate opportunities for alternative product disposal systems that minimize the environmental impact of used products.

The Confederation of European Paper Industries (CEPI) has published reports focusing on the industry's environmental credentials. In 2002, it noted that "a little over 60% of the pulp and paper produced in Europe comes from mills certified under one of the internationally recognised eco-management schemes".  There are a number of ‘eco-labels’ designed to help consumers identify paper tissue products which meet such environmental standards. Eco-labelling entered mainstream environmental policy-making in the late seventies, first with national schemes such as the German Blue Angel programme, to be followed by the Nordic swan (1989). In 1992 a European eco-labelling regulation, known as the EU Flower, was also adopted. The stated objective is to support sustainable development, balancing environmental, social and economical criteria.

In 2019, the NRDC and Stand.earth released a report grading various brands of toilet paper, paper towels, and facial tissue; the report criticized major brands for lacking recycled material.

Types of eco-labels
There are three types of eco-labels, each defined by ISO (International Organization for Standardization).

Type I: ISO 14024
This type of eco-label is one where the criteria are set by third parties (not the manufacturer). They are in theory based on life cycle impacts and are typically based on pass/fail criteria. The one that has European application is the EU Flower.

Type II: ISO 14021
These are based on the manufacturers or retailers own declarations. Well known amongst these are claims of "100% recycled" in relation to tissue/paper.

Type III: ISO 14025
These claims give quantitative details of the impact of the product based on its life cycle. Sometimes known as EPDs (Environmental Product Declarations), these labels are based on an independent review of the life cycle of the product. The data supplied by the manufacturing companies are also independently reviewed.

The most well known example in the paper industry is the Paper Profile. You can tell a Paper Profile meets the Type III requirements when the verifiers logo is included on the document.

An example of an organization that sets standards is the Forest Stewardship Council.

See also
 Air-laid paper
 Crêpe paper
 Handkerchief
 Tissue-pack marketing
 Washi
 Yankee dryer
 Sanitary paper

References

External links

 Sustainably printed custom tissue

Craft materials
Packaging materials
Paper